Sullivan Award  may refer to:
 Algernon Sydney Sullivan Award or Mary Mildred Sullivan Award; awarded at 29-grantee institutions of the Algernon Sydney Sullivan Foundation
 Annie Sullivan Award, given to Special Education Teachers, named after Helen Keller's teacher
 Carl R. Sullivan Award of the International Fisheries Section of the American Fisheries Society
 James E. Sullivan Award, awarded to outstanding amateur athletes in the United States
 Paula E. Sullivan Award, advertising industry award given annually by the Ad Club of San Diego
 Sullivan Award for Heroism by the San Francisco Fire Department
 Walter Sullivan Award for Excellence in Science Journalism
 William Matheus Sullivan Award, annual development award to gifted opera singers by the William Matheus Sullivan Musical Foundation